11-Ketodihydrotestosterone (11-KDHT), also known as 5α-androstan-17β-ol-3,11-dione, is an endogenous, naturally occurring steroid and androgen prohormone that is produced primarily, if not exclusively, in the adrenal glands. It is closely related to 11β-hydroxyandrostenedione (11β-KA4), adrenosterone (11-ketoandrostenedione; 11-KA4), and 11-ketotestosterone (11-KT), which are also produced in the adrenal glands.

See also
 Dihydrotestosterone

References

5α-Reduced steroid metabolites
Secondary alcohols
Androgens and anabolic steroids
Androstanes
Hormones of the suprarenal cortex
Ketones
Sex hormones
Steroid hormones